Chronicles is a double compilation album by Canadian rock band Rush, released in 1990.  The collection was the band's first album to be released in the 1990s, though it was assembled without the participation of the band.  A companion edition of Rush music videos from 1981 to 1987, titled Chronicles: The Video Collection, was also released on VHS and laserdisc.  The video edition was re-named, and re-released on a single DVD in 2001, titled Rush Chronicles – The DVD Collection, with two additional video tracks that are hidden Easter eggs.

Track listing

Personnel 
Geddy Lee – bass, synthesizer, vocals
Alex Lifeson – acoustic and electric guitars
Neil Peart – drums, percussion, lyricist
John Rutsey – drums on "Finding My Way" and "Working Man"

Charts

Certifications
Audio

DVD

References

1990 compilation albums
Anthem Records compilation albums
Rush (band) compilation albums
Mercury Records compilation albums